The 2009 Le Gruyère European Curling Championships were held in Aberdeen, Scotland from 4 to 12 December 2009. The A-Group tournament took place at the Linx Ice Arena, and the B-Group are playing at Curl Aberdeen. 

A total of 51 teams from 30 European countries were competing.

Men's Teams

Group A 

*Ulrik Schmidt skips and throws third stones

Round-robin standings
Final round-robin standings

Round Robin

Draw 1
Saturday 5 December, 08:00

Draw 2
Saturday 3 December, 16:00

Draw 3
Sunday 6 December, 09:00

Draw 4
Sunday 6 December, 19:00

Draw 5
Monday 7 December, 14:00

Draw 6
Tuesday 8 December, 08:00

Draw 7
Tuesday 8 December, 16:00

Draw 8
Wednesday 9 December, 09:00

Draw 9
Wednesday 9 December, 19:00

Placement Game

Tiebreaker

Playoffs

1 vs. 2 game 
Thursday 10 December, 20:00

3 vs. 4 game 
Thursday 10 December, 20:00

Semifinal 
Friday 11 December, 14:00

Gold Medal Final 
Saturday 12 December, 13:30

Group B1

Results 

All times local

Draw 1 Saturday 5 December, 08:00
 2,   13
 8,  5
 2,  15
 7,  6
 6,  10

Draw 2 Saturday 5 December, 16:00
 3,  8
 8,  6
 8,  5
 14,  4

Draw 3 Sunday 6 December, 08:00
 9,  4
 4,  6
 5,  8
 2,  11
 9,  6

Draw 4 Sunday 6 December, 16:00
 12,  0
 4,  15
 4,  7
 10,  9

Draw 5 Monday 7 December, 12:00
 6,   7
 1,   13
 8,  6
 9,  1
 10,  3

Draw 6 Monday 7 December, 20:00
 9,  1
 3,   8
 1,   2
 7,  1

Draw 7 Tuesday 8 December, 12:00
 8,  0
 9,  3
 11,  3
 3,  4
 10,  8

Draw 8 Tuesday 8 December, 20:00
 7,  9
 1,  9
 10,  2
 5,  7

Draw 9 Wednesday 9 December, 08:00
 10,  1
 7,  6
 2,  10
 2,  11

Draw 10 Wednesday 9 December, 16:00
 8,  1
 4,  8
 13,  7
 10,  1
 5,  6

Tiebreaker
 5,  9

Group B2

Results 

All times local

Draw 1 Saturday 5 December, 12:00
 4,  11
 11,  3
 8,  3
 7,  5
 5,  8

Draw 2 Saturday 5 December, 20:00
 5,  10
 7,  5
 5,  13
 5,  7

Draw 3 Sunday 6 December, 12:00
 4,  15
 8,  9
 4,  14
 2,  9
 4,  12
 
Draw 4 Sunday 6 December, 20:00
 8,  2
 5,  8
 10,  6
 6,  3

Draw 5 Monday 7 December, 08:00
 4,   8
 0,   14
 5,   6
 8,   9
 15,  1

Draw 6 Monday 7 December, 16:00
 8,   7
 5,   11
 2,   9
 4,   10

Draw 7 Tuesday 8 December, 08:00
 10,  0
 4,  7
 11,  4
 7,  6
 11,  5

Draw 8 Tuesday 8 December, 16:00
 4,  7
 9,  4
 8,  6
 6,  3

Draw 9 Wednesday 9 December, 12:00
 8,  5
 7,  6
 2,  12
 8,  3

Draw 10 Wednesday 9 December, 20:00
 10,  2
 3,  9
 9,  7
 12,  2
 6,  7

Tiebreakers
 11,  4
 9,  7

Group B Playoffs 

Russia and Netherlands advance to the A-Group

World Challenge Games 
Friday 11 December, 19:00
 6,  2

Saturday 12 December, 08:00
 10,  5

Women's Teams

Group A 

*Jensen skips and throws second stones

Round-robin standings
Final round-robin standings

Round Robin

Draw 1
Saturday 5 December, 12:00

Draw 2
Saturday 5 December, 20:00

Draw 3
Sunday 6 December, 14:00

Draw 4
Monday 7 December, 09:00

Draw 5
Monday 7 December, 19:00

Draw 6
Tuesday 8 December, 12:00

Draw 7
Tuesday 8 December, 20:00

Draw 8
Wednesday 9 December, 14:00

Draw 9
Thursday 10 December, 08:00

Tiebreaker

Playoffs

1 vs. 2 game 
Thursday 10 December, 20:00

3 vs. 4 game 
Thursday 10 December, 20:00

Semifinal 
Friday 11 December, 19:00

Gold Medal Final 
Saturday 12 December, 10:00

Group B1

Results 

All times local

Draw 1 Saturday 5 December, 08:00
 2,  15

Draw 2 Saturday 5 December, 16:00
 10,  3
 1,  14

Draw 3 Sunday 6 December, 08:00
 10,  12

Draw 4 Sunday 6 December, 16:00
 3,  11
 1,  8

Draw 5 Monday 7 December, 12:00
 1,  4

Draw 6 Monday 7 December, 20:00
 8,  6
 6,  8

Draw 7 Tuesday 8 December, 12:00
 8,  2

Draw 8 Tuesday 8 December, 20:00
 6,  13
 8,  2

Draw 9 Wednesday 9 December, 08:00
 6,  5
 vs. 

Draw 10 Wednesday 9 December, 16:00
 13,  3

Group B2

Results 

All times local

Draw 1 Saturday 5 December, 20:00
 6,  4
 8,  4

Draw 2 Sunday 6 December, 12:00
 8,  9

Draw 3 Sunday 6 December, 20:00
 6,  5

Draw 4 Monday 7 December, 08:00
 2,   7

Draw 5 Monday 7 December, 16:00
 3,   7

Draw 6 Tuesday 8 December, 08:00
 9,  6

Draw 7 Tuesday 8 December, 16:00
 2,  6

Draw 8 Wednesday 9 December, 12:00
 17,  1
 4,  5

Group B Playoffs 

Netherlands and Latvia advance to the A-Group

World Challenge Games 
Friday 11 December, 19:00
 4,  6

Saturday 12 December, 08:00
 6,  3

External links
 Official Website of the 2009 European Curling Championships
 European Curling Federation
 Eurosport

European Curling Championships
European Curling Championships, 2009
European Curling Championships
Sports competitions in Aberdeen
2009 in European sport 
International curling competitions hosted by Scotland
21st century in Aberdeen